Georgetown is an unincorporated community and census-designated place in western Kent County, Maryland, United States.Per the 2020 census, the population was 117. It should not be confused with the community of the same name  to the northeast on the Kent/Cecil County border.

Geography

Demographics

2020 census

Note: the US Census treats Hispanic/Latino as an ethnic category. This table excludes Latinos from the racial categories and assigns them to a separate category. Hispanics/Latinos can be of any race.

References

Census-designated places in Kent County, Maryland
Census-designated places in Maryland